Jennifer Ponton (born June 27, 1984) is an American actress, screenwriter and producer, best known for portraying Rubi in the AMC series Dietland.

Early life 
Ponton is an only child raised in Bloomsbury, New Jersey; there she was a 2002 graduate of Phillipsburg High School, where she was active in the New Jersey Speech and Debate Forensics League, as well as drama club and musical groups. She is a 2006 graduate of Ramapo College of New Jersey, where she earned her BA in Theatre.

Career 
Ponton began her career in 2010 with a guest role on the episode "Reaganing" on 30 Rock opposite Kelsey Grammer. She went on to make recurring appearances on Law & Order: SVU, The Heart She Holler, and The Slap, as well as guest appearances on Boardwalk Empire, The Good Wife, The Unbreakable Kimmy Schmidt, Blue Bloods, Deadbeat and The Blacklist. In 2018 she portrayed body positive activist Rubi on the AMC drama Dietland. Ponton also starred in the 2016 film Love on the Run opposite Steve Howey and Frances Fisher, and she has narrated Jennifer Weiner's The Littlest Bigfoot audiobook series. On stage, she originated the role of Dorrie in Halley Feiffer's How to Make Friends and then Kill Them at Rattlestick Playwrights Theatre. She is a member of the Television Academy.

She is a body positivity and fat acceptance activist, having spoken at length about the importance of size inclusion in entertainment. She was also a featured activist and speaker at the 2018 TCF Style Expo and the 2018 CurvyCon.

Ponton is also the co-creator and star of the puppet-led web series The Weirdos Next Door.

Personal life
Ponton and her husband have been residents of the Budd Lake section of Mount Olive Township, New Jersey.

Filmography

References

External links 

1984 births
Living people
21st-century American actresses
Ramapo College alumni
American television actresses
American film actresses
Actresses from New Jersey
People from Bridgewater Township, New Jersey
People from Mount Olive Township, New Jersey
People from Warren County, New Jersey
Phillipsburg High School (New Jersey) alumni